Sampson Community College is a public community college in Clinton, North Carolina. It is part of the North Carolina Community College System.

History
In September 1965, Sampson Community College was established as an extension unit of Goldsboro Industrial Education Center (Wayne Community College).
In 1967, SCC became an independent unit and was called "Sampson Technical Institute", and was later renamed to Sampson Community College in October.

External links
 Official website

Universities and colleges accredited by the Southern Association of Colleges and Schools
North Carolina Community College System colleges
Education in Sampson County, North Carolina
Buildings and structures in Sampson County, North Carolina
Two-year colleges in the United States